Yu-Gi-Oh! Sevens is the seventh main anime series in the Yu-Gi-Oh! franchise and the tenth anime series overall. It is produced by Bridge and broadcast on TV Tokyo. The series is directed by Nobuhiro Kondo. The series follows Yūga and his friends as they show off the delights of Rush Duels while under the watchful eye of the Goha Corporation that oversees the city. On April 28, 2020, it was announced that after episode 5, the remaining episodes would be delayed for five weeks due to the effects of the COVID-19 pandemic. On July 10, 2020, it was announced it will be delayed again due to the aforementioned pandemic and will resume on August 8, 2020. Starting April 4, 2021, it aired on Sunday at 7:30 AM JST.

An edited English dub began production in early 2021, and premiered on Disney XD on June 6, 2022 and on Hulu on June 7, 2022 in the United States.


Episode list

Home media release

Japanese

Notes

References

Sevens (season 1)
2020 Japanese television seasons
2021 Japanese television seasons
Anime postponed due to the COVID-19 pandemic
Anime productions suspended due to the COVID-19 pandemic